Gavialidae is a family of large semiaquatic crocodilians with elongated, narrow snouts. Gavialidae consists of two living species, the gharial (Gavialis gangeticus) and the false gharial (Tomistoma schlegelii), both occurring in Asia. Many extinct members are known from a broader range, including the recently extinct Hanyusuchus. Gavialids are generally regarded as lacking the jaw strength to capture the large mammalian prey favoured by crocodiles and alligators of similar size so their thin snout is best used to catch fish, however the false gharial has been found to have a generalist diet with mature adults preying upon larger vertebrates, such as ungulates.

Taxonomy
The family Gavialidae was proposed by Arthur Adams in 1854 for reptiles with a very long and slender muzzle, webbed feet and nearly equal teeth. It is currently recognized as a crown group, meaning that it only includes the last common ancestor of all extant (living) gavialids (the gharial and false gharial) and their descendants (living or extinct).

Traditionally, crocodiles and alligators were considered more closely related and grouped together in the clade Brevirostres, to the exclusion of the gharials.  This classification was based on morphological studies primarily focused on analyzing skeletal traits of living and extinct fossil species. However, recent molecular studies using DNA sequencing have rejected Brevirostres upon finding the crocodiles and gavialids to be more closely related than the alligators. The new clade Longirostres was named by Harshman et al. in 2003.

In addition, these recent molecular DNA studies consistently indicate that the false gharial (Tomistoma) (and by inference other related extinct forms) traditionally viewed as belonging to the crocodylian subfamily Tomistominae actually belong to Gavialoidea (and Gavialidae). As its name suggests, the false gharial was once thought to be only distantly related to the gharial despite its similar appearance. The false gharial and other tomistomines were traditionally classified within the superfamily Crocodyloidea as close relatives of crocodiles, based solely on morphological evidence.

A 2018 tip dating study by Lee & Yates simultaneously using morphological, molecular (DNA sequencing), and stratigraphic (fossil age) data established the inter-relationships within Crocodilia, which was expanded upon in 2021 by Hekkala et al. using paleogenomics by extracting DNA from the extinct Voay. The tip dating analysis resolved the extinct Thoracosaurus and similar extinct close relatives ("thoracosaurs") as outside of Gavialoidea due to the large time difference. They concluded that the only possible explanation for the morphological data placing thoracosaurs within the gharial lineage was a significant amount of homoplastic convergence between thoracosaurs and Gavialis.

The below cladogram from latest study shows Gavialidae's placement within Crocodylia:

Here is a more detailed cladogram that shows the proposed phylogeny of Gavialidae including extinct members:

Species list

Family Gavialidae
Subfamily Tomistominae
Genus Gavialosuchus?
Genus Maomingosuchus?
Genus Melitosaurus
Genus Paratomistoma?
Genus Thecachampsa?
Genus Tomistoma
Tomistoma schlegelii, false gharial or Malayan gharial
Tomistoma lusitanica
Subfamily Gavialinae
Genus Aktiogavialis
Genus Argochampsa?
Genus Dadagavialis
Genus Eogavialis?
Genus Eosuchus?
Genus Eothoracosaurus?
Genus Gavialis
Gavialis gangeticus, gharial
Gavialis bengawanicus
Genus Gavialosuchus?
Genus Gryposuchus? (may by paraphyletic, along with Gryposuchinae)
Genus Hanyusuchus
Genus Harpacochampsa?
Genus Hesperogavialis
Genus Ikanogavialis
Genus Maomingosuchus?
Genus Ocepesuchus
Genus Paratomistoma?
Genus Penghusuchus
Genus Piscogavialis
Genus Rhamphosuchus
Genus Siquisiquesuchus
Genus Thoracosaurus?
Genus Toyotamaphimeia

† Indicates extinct group

Extant species

References

 
Reptile families
Taxa named by Andrew Leith Adams
Extant Eocene first appearances